Gary Lewis may refer to:

 Gary Lewis (musician) (born 1946), son of Jerry Lewis and lead singer of Gary Lewis & the Playboys
 Gary Lewis (actor) (Gary Stevenson, born 1957), Scottish actor
 Gary Lewis (tight end) (born 1958), former American football player
 Gary Lewis (running back) (1942–1986), American football player
 Gary Lewis (defensive lineman) (born 1961), former American and Canadian football player
 Gary Lewis (outdoor writer) (born 1967), American writer
 Gary Christie Lewis (born 1970), New Zealand carpenter, former husband of Lady Davina Windsor
 Garry Lewis (gridiron football) (born 1967), American football player
 Garry Lewis (soccer) (born 1986), American soccer player

See also

 Gary Lewis & the Playboys (band) 1960s U.S. pop music band
 
 
 Lewis (surname)
 Gary (given name)
 Jerry Lewis (disambiguation)
 Lewis (disambiguation)
 Gary (disambiguation)